Orography is the study of the topographic relief of mountains, and can more broadly include hills, and any part of a region's elevated terrain. Orography (also known as oreography, orology or oreology) falls within the broader discipline of geomorphology. The term orography comes from the Greek: , hill, to write.

Uses
Mountain ranges and elevated land masses have a major impact on global climate. For instance, the elevated areas of East Africa substantially determine the strength of the Indian monsoon. In scientific models, such as general circulation models, orography defines the lower boundary of the model over land.

When a river's tributaries or settlements by the river are listed in 'orographic sequence', they are in order from the highest (nearest the source of the river) to the lowest or mainstem (nearest the mouth). This method of listing tributaries is similar to the Strahler Stream Order, where the headwater tributaries are listed as category 1.

Orographic precipitation

Orographic precipitation, also known as relief precipitation, is precipitation generated by a forced upward movement of air upon encountering a physiographic upland (see anabatic wind). This lifting can be caused by two mechanisms:

 The upward deflection of large scale horizontal flow by the orography.
 The anabatic or upward vertical propagation of moist air up an orographic slope, caused by daytime heating of the mountain barrier surface.

Upon ascent, the air that is being lifted expands and cools adiabatically. This adiabatic cooling of a rising moist air parcel may lower its temperature to its dew point, thus allowing for condensation of the water vapor contained within it, and hence the formation of a cloud. If enough water vapor condenses into cloud droplets, these droplets may become large enough to fall to the ground as precipitation.

Terrain-induced precipitation is a major factor for meteorologists to consider when they forecast the local weather. Orography can play a major role in determining the type, amount, intensity and duration of precipitation events. Researchers have discovered that barrier width, slope steepness and updraft speed are major contributors when it comes to achieving the optimal amount and intensity of orographic precipitation. Computer models simulating these factors have shown that narrow barriers and steeper slopes produce stronger updraft speeds, which in turn increase orographic precipitation.

Orographic precipitation is known to occur on oceanic islands, such as the Hawaiian Islands and New Zealand; much of the rainfall received on such islands is on the windward side, and the leeward side tends to be quite dry, almost desert-like.

Another area in which orographic precipitation is known to occur is the Pennines in the north of England: the west side of the Pennines receives more rain than the east because the clouds (generally arriving from the west) are forced up and over the hills and cause the rain to tend to fall on the western slopes.

See also
 Coverage (telecommunication)
 Orographic lift

References

Sources

External links
 Map of the Orography of Europe from Euratlas.com

Geomorphology